The Jets are a Tongan American family band from Minneapolis, Minnesota, composed of brothers and sisters LeRoy, Eddie, Eugene, Haini, Rudy, Kathi, Elizabeth, and Moana Wolfgramm, who perform pop, R&B, and dance music. They started performing as a family band in 1977. The group enjoyed worldwide success in 1985–1990, performing three world tours, and producing five top-10 hits on the US Billboard Hot 100.

Background
The original band consisted of the eight oldest children of Maikeli "Mike" and Vaké Wolfgramm, who were originally from Tonga. The family has 17 children: 15 by birth, and two, Eddie and Eugene, by adoption. The children attended Robbinsdale Cooper High School. The family are members of the Church of Jesus Christ of Latter-day Saints.

The band initially called themselves Quasar after a now-defunct brand of television sets. They changed their name to the Jets, a name taken from the Elton John song "Bennie and the Jets" on the suggestion of manager Don Powell.

Career
The original members of the Jets had a number of Billboard Hot 100 hits, five of which reached the top ten, including the 1986 single "Crush on You", which peaked at No. 3 in July 1986 (No. 5 UK, No. 4 US R&B, No. 4 US Dance). They are also known for the singles "You Got It All", "Cross My Broken Heart", "Rocket 2 U" and "Make It Real". "Sendin' All My Love", which peaked at No. 88 on the Hot 100, reached No. 1 on the Billboard dance chart. "You Got It All" and "Make It Real", both ballads featuring lead vocals by Elizabeth Wolfgramm, were No. 1 hits on the Billboard adult contemporary chart. The band was nominated for a Grammy Award in 1988 for the song "Rocket 2 U" that featured lead vocals by Haini Wolfgramm. The Jets also performed the theme song for Chip 'n Dale Rescue Rangers in 1989.

The group performed "The Star-Spangled Banner" at the seventh game of the 1987 World Series, held in their hometown of Minneapolis, and at Game 3 of the 1991 Stanley Cup Finals in suburban Bloomington. The band also performed at the 1988 Summer Olympics in Seoul, South Korea and the 2002 Winter Olympics in Salt Lake City, Utah.

Recent appearances
On October 10, 2009, seven of the original band members reunited to perform at the Mega 80s & 90s Music Festival in Honolulu, Hawaii along with fellow MCA recording artists Ready for the World, the Cover Girls and En Vogue.
On April 9, 2010, all of the original members except Eugene performed at the State Theatre in Minneapolis. It was billed as their 25th-anniversary reunion show.
In 2015, the band celebrated its 30th anniversary with performances in Manila and Cebu, Philippines.
In July 2015 in Orem, Utah, the Jets performed a hometown concert with Debbie Gibson.
The Jets were featured on the TV One music documentary Unsung on March 17, 2019.

Line-up
The Jets' original lineup consisted of eight of the siblings.

LeRoy Wolfgramm (born July 19, 1965) – vocals, electric guitar
Eddie Wolfgramm  (born August 14, 1966) – vocals, tenor saxophone, percussion
Eugene Wolfgramm (born September 24, 1967) – vocals, conga, alto saxophone
Haini Wolfgramm (born January 25, 1968) – vocals, bass guitar
Rudy Wolfgramm (born March 1, 1969) – vocals, drums
Kathi Wolfgramm (born September 6, 1970) – vocals, keyboards, percussion
Elizabeth Wolfgramm (born August 19, 1972) – vocals, keyboards, percussion
Moana Wolfgramm (born October 13, 1973) – vocals, keyboards, percussion

Spin-off
In 1988, Eugene Wolfgramm and Joe Pasquale formed the duo Boys Club, which recorded for MCA Records. Boys Club released the song "I Remember Holding You", which reached No. 8 on the Hot 100. Eugene later reunited for the album The Best of the Jets (1990), but he and other siblings (Eddie, Elizabeth, Kathi) eventually left the band in succession. The band was also featured on the soundtrack for The Disney Afternoon, on which they performed the Chip 'n Dale Rescue Rangers theme song. They also appeared on the soundtracks for Burglar (1987) ("Tough Guys"), Beverly Hills Cop II (1987) ("Cross My Broken Heart"), The Karate Kid Part III ("Under Any Moon") and The Family Man (2000) ("La La Means I Love You").

Influence
American pop singer Britney Spears recorded a new version of "You Got It All" in 1997, which appears on international editions of her 2000 album Oops!... I Did It Again. Musical artists Arnee Hidalgo, Pinay and MYMP have also covered the song. "Crush on You" is featured as the base sample for the French house anthem "Intro" by Alan Braxe and Fred Falke (2000).

Pop singer Aaron Carter included "Crush on You" on his first album, which became a top-10 single in Australia, Germany and the United Kingdom in 1997. Singer Nayobe recorded a version of "Make It Real" that became a hit in Latin America. Exposé recorded a version of "The Same Love" on their 1992 self-titled album. More recently, the UK electronic music act Nero sampled "Crush on You" on their 2011 track of the same name.

The Jets and the Jets Original Family Band

As of 2022, there are two touring groups of Jets, which include original members:

The Jets: Elizabeth, Eddie, Kathi, Moana
The Jets Original Family Band: Haini, LeRoy, Rudy

Discography

Studio albums

Live albums

Compilation albums

Singles

Tours
 1985–1986: The Jets World Tour
 1986: Christmas with The Jets World Tour
 1987–1988: Magic World Tour
 1989: Believe World Tour
 2015: The Jets - 30th Anniversary Concert

References

Further reading
 

American dance music groups
American contemporary R&B musical groups
Child musical groups
Family musical groups
Sibling musical groups
Teen pop groups
Musical groups from Minnesota
Latter Day Saints from Minnesota
American freestyle music groups
MCA Records artists
American electronic music groups
1985 establishments in Minnesota